Felicitas D. Goodman (January 30, 1914 in Budapest, Hungary – March 30, 2005 in Columbus, Ohio, USA) was an American linguist and anthropologist. She was a highly regarded expert in linguistics and anthropology and researched and explored Ecstatic Trance Postures for many years. She studied the phenomenon of "speaking in tongues" in Pentecostal congregations in Mexico. She is the author of such well-received books as Speaking in Tongues and Where the Spirits Ride the Wind: Trance Journeys and Other Ecstatic Experiences. Her work has been published mostly in the United States and Germany.

Biography 

Goodman was born Felicitas Daniels in Budapest, Hungary in 1914, the first of two children. Her parents immigrated to Hungary from Germany and spoke German at home. She attended college at Heidelberg University in Germany. After World War II she immigrated to Columbus, Ohio with her three children; her fourth child was born a few years later. When her children were grown, Felicitas Goodman returned to school and earned a master's degree in linguistics and a doctorate in cultural anthropology at Ohio State University. She taught at Denison University until her retirement in 1979.

In 1978, Goodman founded The Cuyamungue Institute in an area known as Cuyamungue, New Mexico to continue her research into altered states of consciousness and to hold workshops. After the publishing of Where the Spirits Ride the Wind: Trance Journeys and Other Ecstatic Experiences Goodman's following grew, primarily in the US and Germany, among "New Age" and "Neo-Shaman" practitioners as well as scholars in her field. Before her death in 2005, Goodman had published over 40 articles and more than seven books. Her book, The Exorcism of Anneliese Michel, was the inspiration for the film The Exorcism of Emily Rose (in which a fictionalized version of Goodman was played by Shohreh Aghdashloo).

A biography of Goodman in comic book form (Pueblo Spirits: in the life of Felicitas D. Goodman) was published by her daughter, Susan G. Josephson in 2014.

Works

Publications 

1945: Die Blaue Brücke. Fairy Tales by Felicitas Goodman. Karlsruhe: Schwerdtfeger Publishing House.
1965: “Immer noch...” A Poem.  P. 47 in Um den Schlaf Gebracht.  Karlsruhe: Rüdiger.
1969: “Phonetic Analysis of Glossolalia in Four Cultural Settings.”  Journal for the Scientific Study of Religion.  8: 227-239.
1969: “Glossolalia: Speaking in Tongues in Four Cultural Settings.” Confinia Psychiatrica 12: 113-129.
1971: “Glossolalia and Single Limb Trance: Some Parallels.”  Psychotherapy and Psychosomatics 19: 92-103.
1972: Speaking in Tongues: A Cross-cultural Study of Glossolalia. Chicago: University of Chicago Press.
1973: “Glossolalia and Hallucination in Pentecostal Congregations.”  Psychiatria Clinica 6: 97-103.
1973.: “The Apostolics of Yucatan: A Case Study of a Religious Movement.”  In Religion, Altered States of Consciousness, and Social Change. Erika Bourguignon, ed.  Columbus,  OH: Ohio State University Press, pp. 178–218.
1973: “Limits to Cultural Conditioning: Glossolalia in the United States in Cross-Cultural Perspective.”  Paper presented to the 72nd Annual Meeting of the American Anthropological Association, New Orleans, 29 November 1973.
1974: “Disturbances in the Apostolic Church: A Trance-Based Upheaval in Yucatán.”  In Trance, Healing and Hallucination by Felicitas Goodman, Jeannette M. Henney, and Esther Pressel. New York: Wiley Interscience, pp. 227–364.
1974: “Not to Speak in Tongues: Abstention from Glossolalia in a Yucatecan Crisis Cult. (Paper prepared for the session on “Sociology of Language and Religion.” Eighth World Congress of Sociology. Toronto, Canada, August, 1974).
1975: “The Effect of Trance on Memory Content.”  Psychiatria Clinica 8: 243-249.
1975: “Some biological aspects of glossolalia.” In Ghosh Biology and Language. New York: Academic Press. (Check source).
1975: “Belief Systems, Millenary Expectations, and Behavior.”  pp. 130–138 in Symbols and Society: Essays on Belief Systems in Action.  Southern Anthropological Society Proceedings, Nol 9.  Carole E. Hill, ed. Athens, GA: Southern Anthropological Society.
1980: “Triggering of Altered States of Consciousness as Group Event: A New Case from Yucatan.”  Confinia Psychiatrica 23: 26-34.
1980: Anneliese Michel und ihre Dämonen.  Stein am Rhein: Christiana.
1980: “Women in Yucatán.”  pp. 213–233 in A World of Women. Erika Bourguignon and all contributors.  New York: Praeger.
1981: “States of Consciousness: A Study of Soundtracks.”  The Journal of Mind and Behavior 2: 209-219.
1981: The Exorcism of Anneliese Michel. Garden City: Doubleday and Co., Inc.
1985: Dreamtime: Concerning the Boundary between Wilderness and Civilization. By Hans Peter Duerr. Translated by Felicitas Goodman.  Oxford: Blackwell.
1985: “Learning the Daybreak Song.”  pp. 94–103 in A Time to Weep; A Time to Sing: Faith Journeys of Women Religious Scholars of Religion.  Mary Jo Meadow and Carole A. Rayburn, eds.  Minneapolis, MN: Winston.
1986: “Body Posture and Religious Altered State of Consciousness: An Experimental Investigation.”  Journal of Humanistic Psychology 26: 81-118.
1986: “Spontaneous Initiation Experiences in an Experimental Setting.”  pp. 68–80 in Proceedings of the Third International Conference on the Study of Shamanism and Alternate Modes of Healing. (Check pages).

“Singing Shaman Ritual (experiential).”  In the same volume; check pages.

1987: “Shamanic Journey (experiential session).”  pp. 112–122 in Proceedings of the Fourth International Conference on the Study of Shamanism and Alternate Modes of Healing.
1987: Anneliese Michel und ihre Dämonen. 2nd ed. Stein am Rhein: Christiana.
1987: `Visions.' In The Encyclopedia of Religion. Mircea Eliade, ed. New York: Macmillan.  Vol.15: 282-88. Also “Glossolalia.” Check volume and pages.
1988: “Shamanic Trance Postures.”  pp. 53–61 in Shaman's Path. Healing, Personal Growth, and Empowerment.  Compiled and edited by Gary Dore.
1988:  Ecstasy. Ritual and Alternate Reality; Religion in a Pluralistic World. Bloomington: Indiana University Press.
1988:  How About Demons: Possession and Exorcism in the Modern World. Bloomington: Indiana University Press.
1988: “The Nature of Ego in Experimental Shamanism (including experience and discussion). Pp. 215-224 in the Proceedings of the Fifth International Conference on the Study of Shamanism and Alternate Modes of Healing.
1989: Wo die Geister auf den Winden reiten.  Freiburg im Breisgau: Hermann Bauer.
1989: “The Neurophysiology of Shamanic Ecstasy.”  pp. 377–379 in Shamanism Past and Present. Vol 2.  Mihály Hoppál and Otto von Sadovszky, eds.
1989: “Beware the Symbols: The Shaman Rides a Horse.” Pp. ???-??? in Proceedings of the Sixth International Conference on the Study of Shamanism and Alternate Modes of Healing.
1990: “The Oldest Shaman is a Shamaness: Spirit Journey with the Galgenberg Figurine.” pp. 303–312 in the Proceedings of the Seventh International Conference on the Study of Shamanism and Alternate Modes of Healing.
1990: “A Trance Dance with Masks: Research and Performance at the Cuyamungue Institute.” The Dance Review 34: 102-114.
1990: Jewels on the Path. a Spirit Notebook . Santa Fe: the Cuyamungue Institute.
1990: Where the Spirits Ride the Wind: Trance Journeys and Other Ecstatic Experiences. Bloomington: Indiana University Press.
1991: Ekstase, Besessenheit, Dämonen: Die geheimnisvolle Seite der Religion. Gütersloh: Gütersloh Publishers.
1991: “A Masked Trance Dance.”  pp. 259–264 in the Proceedings of the Eighth International Conference on the Study of Shamanism and Alternate Modes of Healing.
1992: “Alte Wege neu gegangen.”  In ab 40, 1 (1992) 96-103.  (A German language magazine by, for, and about women. How they live, what they think, who they are. After the age of 40. Felicitas translated it pro manuscripto).
1992: Trance: der uralte Weg zum religiösen Erleben. Rituelle Körperhaltungen und ekstatische Erlebnisse.  Gütersloh: Güterloh Publishing House.
1993: “The Nazca Lines: A New Hypothesis.”  pp. 262–273 pp. 68–60 in Proceedings of the Tenth International Conference on the Study of Shamanism and Alternate Modes of Healing.
1993: Panel Discussion on Healing Interethnic Relationships with Royal E. Alsup, Ann Goodman, Ruth-Inge Heinze, and Jack Norton. Same Volume; check pages.
1993: “Ekstase,” and “Magie.”  pp 62–67; 190-195, in Wörterbuch der Religions Psychologie.  Siegfried Rudolf Dunde, ed. Gütersloh: Gütersloh Publishing House.
1993: Wo die Geister auf den Winden reiten. Trancereisen und ekstatische Erlebnisse.  3rd edition. A corrected version. of 1989.
1993: “Das Erlebnis der Besessenheit.”   Manuskripte: Zeitschrift für Literatur 121a: 56-67.
1994: Die andere Wirklichkeit: Das Religiöse in einer pluralistischen Gesellschaft.  Munich: Trickster.
1994: Jewels on the Path. A Spirit Notebook. Volume II. Santa Fe: the Cuyamungue Institute
1994: “The Animal Connection.”  pp. 226–234 in the Proceedings of the Eleventh International Conference on the Study of Shamanism and Alternate Modes of Healing.
1994: “Shamans, Witches, and the Rediscovery of Trance Postures.”  pp. 15–33 in Witchcraft Today. Book Three. Witchcraft and Shamanism. Chas. S. Clifton, ed. St. Paul, MN: Llewellyn Publications.
1994: Lichaamshoudingen: en hun spirituele mogelijkheden. Tr. By Gerhard Grassman. (Dutch translation of Trance [Gütersloh, 1992]).
1995: “Shamanic Journey (Experiential).” pp. 151–154 in the Proceedings of the Twelfth International Conference on the Study of Shamanism and Alternate Modes of Healing.
1996: Meine Letzten 40 Tage: Eine indianische Vision über das Sterben und den Tod.  Zürich and Düsseldorf: Walter.
1996: “Rituelle Körperhaltungen und ekstatische Erlebnisse.”  Imagination (Formerly Ärtzliche Praxis und Psychotherapie)  2: 26-40.
1996 : “The Locked Door of Paradise: Closed versus Open Religious Systems .” Pp. ???-??? in Proceedings of the Thirteenth International Conference on the Study of Shamanism and Alternate Modes of Healing.
1996: “Shamanic Journey (Experiential).” Same Volume; check pages.
1997: “Ritual Body Postures, Channeling, and the Ecstatic Body Trance.” Jahrbuch für Ethnomedizin und Bewusstseinsforschung / Yearbook for Ethomedicine and the Study of Consciousness.  Christian Rätsch and John R. Baker.  6-7: 71-76.
1997: My Last Forty Days: A Visionary Journey among the Pueblo Spirits . Bloomington and Indianapolis, IN: Indiana University Press (check).
1998: Ekstatische Trance: Neue rituelle Körperhaltungen, das Arbeitsbuch. With Nana Nauwald.  Edition Nada, Bad Bevensen.
1999: Die blaue Brücke. Bad Bevenson: Nada. A new edition of 1945 with color illustrations by Nana Nauwald.
2000: “Trance, Posture, and Ritual: Access to the Alternate Reality.”  Pp ???-???  in The Nature and Function of Rituals: Fire From Heaven.  Ruth Inge-Heinze, ed.  Portsmouth, NH: Greenwood Publishing Group.
2001: Maya Apocalypse: Seventeen Years with the Women of a Yucatán Village.  Bloomington and Indianapolis: Indiana University Press.
2002: Utolsó Negyven Napom: Látomásos utazás a pueblo szellemek közöt. Szentendre: Leviter Kiadó.
2003: Ecstatic Trace: A Workbook. New Ritual Body Postures.  With Nana Nauwald. Havelte, Netherlands: Binkey Kok Publications. Translation of 1998
2003: Der Åndene Rir Vinden. Transereiser og andre ekstatiske erfaringer. Norwegian translation of Where the Spirits Ride the Wind: Part 1: The Search for the Spirits. Tvedestrand: eutopiA publishing house.
2004: Hvordan flyh med åndene
2005: Myter fra den evige nåtid.
2005: The Exorcism of Anneliese Michel.  Reprint of 1981 by Wipf & Stock, Eugene, OR.
n/d: TranceRituale für Jugendliche. ReEducation #181.  Werner Pieper's MedienXperimente. D-69488. Löhrbach. Austria. (This was given to Frances to have translated by a friend of the Institute.)

Books 
 Ecstatic Body Postures: An Alternate Reality Workbook", Bear & Company; Original ed. edition (May 1, 1995) 1879181223 (10), 978-1879181229 (13)
 Ecstasy, Ritual and Alternate Reality: Religion in a Pluralistic World, Indiana University Press; Edition: Reissue (1. Dezember 1988),  (10),  (13)
 The Exorcism of Anneliese Michel, Resource Publications (OR) (November 2005),  (10),  (13)
 How About Demons?: Possession and Exorcism in the Modern World'', (Folklore Today), Indiana University Press (1. Mai 1988),  (10),  (13)

References

External links 

Linguists from the United States
Anthropology writers
1914 births
2005 deaths
Hungarian anthropologists
American women anthropologists
American people of German descent
Hungarian emigrants to the United States
Women linguists
People from Budapest
Heidelberg University alumni
Ohio State University Graduate School alumni
Denison University faculty
20th-century American women writers
20th-century American non-fiction writers
American women non-fiction writers
20th-century American anthropologists
20th-century linguists
American women academics
21st-century American women